Reade is a given name and surname of English origin. Notable people with the name include:

Given name
 Reade Baker (born 1947), Canadian racehorse trainer
 Reade Seligmann, defendant in Duke lacrosse case
 Reade Stafford (1542–1605), English gentleman

Surname
 Bob Reade (1932–2020), former American football player and coach
 Brian Reade (born 1957), British journalist
 Charles Reade (1814–1884), English novelist
 Charles Reade (town planner) (1880–1933), town planner
 Dolores Reade, singer, entertainer, and philanthropist 
 Duane Reade, an American drugstore
 Edward Anderton Reade (1807–1886), British civil servant in India
 Edwin Godwin Reade (1812–1894), American politician
 Frank Reade, the protagonist of a series of dime novels published primarily for boys
 George Reade (1687–1756), British Army officer
 Herbert Taylor Reade (1828–1897), Canadian military surgeon
 John Edmund Reade (1800–1870), English poet and novelist
 John Reade (1837–1919), Irish-born Canadian journalist, essayist, and poet
 Joseph Reade (politician) (1694 – 1771), American vestryman and politician
 Joseph Bancroft Reade (1801–1870), English photographic pioneer
 Lawrence Reade (disambiguation), cricketers
 Linda R. Reade (born 1948), United States District judge
 Matthew Reade, several
 Nicholas Reade (born 1946), former Bishop of Blackburn
 Paul Reade (1943–1997), English composer
 Pauline Reade, murder victim
 Peter Reade (born 1939), British former sailor
 Reade baronets, family, both in the Baronetage of England
 Richard Reade (1511–1575), English-born judge
 Robert Reade, bishop
 Shanaze Reade (born 1988), British professional BMX rider
 Sophie Reade, game show contestant
 Tara Reade, former U.S. Senate aide
 Teddy Reade, American professional wrestler
 Thomas Mellard Reade (1832–1909), English geologist, architect, and civil engineer
 Thomas Reade (1782–1849), British army officer
 Walter Reade (1884–1952), American theater founder
 William Reade (bishop) (1283–1385), medieval Bishop of Chichester
 William Winwood Reade (1838–1875), English historian, explorer, and philosopher

See also
 Reade Township, Pennsylvania
 Read (surname), alternate spelling of the surname
 Rhead (surname)
 Reed (name)
 Reid (disambiguation)